Julián Soler (born Julián Díaz Pavia; 17 February 1907 – 5 May 1977) was a Mexican film director, actor, and screenwriter of the Golden Age of Mexican cinema. In his career spanning half a century, Soler received two Ariel Award nominations.

Early life
Julián Soler was born in Ciudad Jiménez, Chihuahua, as Julián Díaz Pavía on 17 February 1907 to Domingo Díaz García and Irene Pavía Soler. He was the elder brother of Mercedes Soler and the younger brother of Fernando Soler, Andrés Soler, and Domingo Soler. His family is known as the Soler Dynasty.

Selected filmography

Actor

 Cruz Diablo (1934)
 Por mis pistolas (1938)
 The Coward (1939)
 The Whip (1939)
 Simón Bolívar (1942)
 Doña Bárbara (1943)
 Michael Strogoff (1944)
 The Two Orphans (1944)
 Amok (1945)
 He Who Died of Love (1945)
 Rostros olvidados (1952)

Director

 Una gallega en México (1949)
 La miel se fue de la luna (1951)
 A Gringo Girl in Mexico (1951)
 A media luz los tres (1958)
 The Castle of the Monsters (1958)
 The Miracle Roses (1960)
 My Mother Is Guilty (1960)
 If I Were a Millionaire (1962)
 Casa de Mujeres (1966)
 El Jibarito Rafael (1969)

References

External links

1907 births
1977 deaths
Mexican film directors
Mexican male film actors
Male actors from Chihuahua (state)
20th-century Mexican male actors